This article is about the particular significance of the decade 1720 - 1729 to Wales and its people.

Incumbents
Prince of Wales 
George (until 1727) (became George II)
Frederick (from January 8, 1729)
Princess of Wales - Caroline of Ansbach (until 1727)

Events
1720

Charles Hanbury Williams succeeds to the estate of his godfather, and takes the surname Williams.
1721

December 30 - Bridget Vaughan marries Arthur Bevan, a barrister.
1722

1723

1724

A charity school is built at Caerleon-on-Usk as the result of a bequest from Charles Williams.
1725

4 May - Ann Thomas (the "Maid of Cefn Ydfa") marries Anthony Maddocks.
Silvanus Bevan is elected a Fellow of the Royal Society on the recommendation of Sir Isaac Newton.
1726

26 July - Prince Frederick, son of the Prince of Wales, is created Baron Snowdon by his grandfather, King George I of Great Britain.
1727

The Piercefield estate is sold for £3,366, 5.6d to Thomas Rous of Wotton-under-Edge.
1728

1729

8 January - Prince Frederick, son of King George II, is created Prince of Wales, nearly two years after his father's accession.
1 March - A St. David's Society is established by Welsh immigrants in Philadelphia.
19 October - John Harris becomes Bishop of Llandaff.
Zachariah Williams is admitted as a poor brother pensioner of the Charterhouse in London.

Arts and literature

New books
1721
Ellis Pugh - Annerch ir Cymru (first Welsh book published in America)
1723
Henry Rowlands - Mona Antiqua Restaurata
Christmas Samuel - Llun Agrippa
1724
Owen Wynne - The Life of Sir Leoline Jenkins
1725
Dafydd Lewys - Golwg ar y Byd
1729
Christmas Samuel - Golwg ar y Testament Newydd

Music

Births
1720
July 22 - Sir Herbert Lloyd, 1st Baronet, politician (d. 1769)
1722
May 9 - Morgan Edwards, Baptist historian (d. 1795)
1723
February 23 - Richard Price, philosopher (d. 1791)
March 5 - Princess Mary of Wales, daughter of the Prince and Princess of Wales (d. 1772)
1724
April - Joshua Eddowes, printer and bookseller (d. 1811)
December 4 - Princess Louise of Wales, daughter of the Prince and Princess of Wales (d. 1751)
1725
May - Llewellin Penrose, painter 
September 7 - Francis Homfray, industrialist (d. 1798)
1726
June 14 - Thomas Pennant, traveller and writer (d. 1798)
William Jones, poet, antiquary and radical (d. 1795)

Deaths
1720
March 7 - John Morgan (of Rhiwpera), politician, 49
April/May - Robert Wynne, clergyman and poet
August 29 - Charles Williams, merchant, 87
December 31 - John Wynne, industrialist
1721
July 8 - Elihu Yale, benefactor of Yale University, 72
date unknown - Sir William Glynne, 2nd Baronet
1722
February 10 - Bartholomew Roberts, pirate ("Black Bart"), 39 (in battle)
November 16 - John Vaughan, reformer, 59
1723
December 28 - Sir Charles Lloyd, 1st Baronet, of Milfield, politician, 61
1724
March 22 - John Evans, Bishop of Bangor and Meath, 73?
June 1 - Erasmus Saunders, clergyman, 54?
date unknown - Richard Bulkeley, 4th Viscount Bulkeley
1725
December 15 - Francis Edwardes, politician
1729
April 29 - Sir Stephen Glynne, 3rd Baronet, 64
September - Sir Stephen Glynne, 4th Baronet, 35?
September 1 - Sir Richard Steele, satirist, 57

 
18th century in Wales
Wales
Wales
Decades in Wales